A cedilla (  (from Spanish cedilla, "small ceda", i.e. small "z") or cedille (from French) is a hook or tail ( ¸ ) added under certain letters as a diacritical mark to modify their pronunciation. In Catalan, French, and Portuguese (where it is called a cedilha) it is used only under the letter c (forming ç), and the entire letter is called, respectively,  (i.e. It is used to mark vowel nasalization in many languages of sub-Saharan Africa, including Vute from Cameroon.

This diacritic is not to be confused with the ogonek ( ̨ ), which resembles the cedilla but mirrored. It looks also very similar to the diacrital comma, mainly used for the Romanian script.

Origin

The tail originated in Spain as the bottom half of a miniature cursive z. The word cedilla is the diminutive of the Old Spanish name for this letter, . An obsolete spelling of cedilla is cerilla. The earliest use in English cited by the Oxford English Dictionary is a 1599 Spanish-English dictionary and grammar. Chambers' Cyclopædia is cited for the printer-trade variant ceceril in use in 1738. Its use in English is not universal and applies to loan words from French and Portuguese such as façade, limaçon and cachaça (often typed facade, limacon and cachaca because of lack of ç keys on English language keyboards).

With the advent of modernism, the calligraphic nature of the cedilla was thought somewhat jarring on sans-serif typefaces, and so some designers instead substituted a comma design, which could be made bolder and more compatible with the style of the text. This reduces the visual distinction between the cedilla and the diacritical comma.

C

The most frequent character with cedilla is "ç" ("c" with cedilla, as in façade). It was first used for the sound of the voiceless alveolar affricate  in old Spanish and stems from the Visigothic form of the letter "z" (ꝣ), whose upper loop was lengthened and reinterpreted as a "c", whereas its lower loop became the diminished appendage, the cedilla.

It represents the "soft" sound , the voiceless alveolar sibilant, where a "c" would normally represent the "hard" sound  (before "a", "o", "u", or at the end of a word) in English and in certain Romance languages such as Catalan, Galician, French (where ç appears in the name of the language itself), Ligurian, Occitan, and Portuguese. In Occitan, Friulian and Catalan ç can also be found at the beginning of a word or at the end.

It is also sometimes used this way in Manx, to distinguish it from the velar fricative.

In the International Phonetic Alphabet, ⟨ç⟩ represents the voiceless palatal fricative.

S

The character "ş" represents the voiceless postalveolar fricative  (as in "show") in several languages, including many belonging to the Turkic languages, and included as a separate letter in their alphabets:
 Turkish
 Azerbaijani
 Crimean Tatar
 Gagauz
 Tatar
 Turkmen
 Romanian (substitution use when S-comma [Ș] was missing from pre-3.0 Unicode standards, and older standards, still frequent, but an error)
 Kurdish
In HTML character entity references &#350; and &#351; can be used.

T

Gagauz uses Ţ (T with cedilla), one of the few languages to do so, and Ş (S with cedilla). Besides being present in some Gagauz orthographies, T with Cedilla also exists in the General Alphabet of Cameroon Languages, in the Kabyle language, in the Manjak and Mankanya languages, and possibly elsewhere.

The Unicode characters for Ţ (T with cedilla) and Ş (S with cedilla) were implemented for Romanian in Windows-1250. In Windows 7, Microsoft corrected the error by replacing T-cedilla with T-comma (Ț) and S-cedilla with S-comma (Ș).

In 1868, Ambroise Firmin-Didot suggested in his book  (Observations on French Spelling) that French phonetics could be better regularized by adding a cedilla beneath the letter "t" in some words. A similar effect occurs with other prefixes or within words. Firmin-Didot surmised that a new character could be added to French orthography. A letter of the same description T-cedilla (majuscule: Ţ, minuscule: ţ) is used in Gagauz. A similar letter, the T-comma (majuscule: Ț, minuscule: ț), does exist in Romanian, but it has a comma accent, not a cedilla.

Languages with other characters with cedillas

Latvian
Comparatively, some consider the diacritics on the palatalized Latvian consonants  and formerly  to be cedillas. Although their Adobe glyph names are commas, their names in the Unicode Standard are "g", "k", "l", "n", and "r" with a cedilla.  The letters were introduced to the Unicode standard before 1992, and their names cannot be altered. The uppercase equivalent "Ģ" sometimes has a regular cedilla.

Marshallese
In Marshallese orthography, four letters in Marshallese have cedillas: <   >.  In standard printed text they are always cedillas, and their omission or the substitution of comma below and dot below diacritics are nonstandard.

, many font rendering engines do not display any of these properly, for two reasons:
 "" and "" usually do not display properly at all, because of the use of the cedilla in Latvian.  Unicode has precombined glyphs for these letters, but most quality fonts display them with comma below diacritics to accommodate the expectations of Latvian orthography.  This is considered nonstandard in Marshallese. The use of a zero-width non-joiner between the letter and the diacritic can alleviate this problem: "" and "" may display properly, but may not; see below.
 "" and "" do not currently exist in Unicode as precombined glyphs, and must be encoded as the plain Latin letters "" and "" with the combining cedilla diacritic.  Most Unicode fonts issued with Windows do not display combining diacritics properly, showing them too far to the right of the letter, as with Tahoma ("m̧" and "o̧") and Times New Roman ("m̧" and "o̧").  This mostly affects "", and may or may not affect "".  But some common Unicode fonts like Arial Unicode MS ("m̧" and "o̧"), Cambria ("m̧" and "o̧") and Lucida Sans Unicode ("m̧" and "o̧") do not have this problem.  When "" is properly displayed, the cedilla is either underneath the center of the letter, or is underneath the right-most leg of the letter, but is always directly underneath the letter wherever it is positioned.

Because of these font display issues, it is not uncommon to find nonstandard ad hoc substitutes for these letters.  The online version of the Marshallese-English Dictionary (the only complete Marshallese dictionary in existence) displays the letters with dot below diacritics, all of which do exist as precombined glyphs in Unicode: "", "", "" and "".  The first three exist in the International Alphabet of Sanskrit Transliteration, and "" exists in the Vietnamese alphabet, and both of these systems are supported by the most recent versions of common fonts like Arial, Courier New, Tahoma and Times New Roman.  This sidesteps most of the Marshallese text display issues associated with the cedilla, but is still inappropriate for polished standard text.

Vute
Vute, a Mambiloid language from Cameroon, uses cedilla for the nasalization of all vowel qualities (cf. the ogonek used in Polish and Navajo for the same purpose). This includes unconventional roman letters that are formalized from the IPA into the official writing system.  These include <i̧ ȩ ɨ̧ ə̧ a̧ u̧ o̧ ɔ̧>.

Hebrew
The ISO 259 romanization of Biblical Hebrew uses Ȩ (E with cedilla) and Ḝ (E with cedilla and breve).

Letters with cedilla

Similar diacritics
This is particularly confusing with letters which can take either diacritic: for example, the consonant  is written as "ş" in Turkish but "ș" in Romanian, and Romanian writers will sometimes use the former instead of the latter because of insufficient computer knowledge.

Encodings
Unicode provides precomposed characters for some Latin letters with cedillas.  Others can be formed using the cedilla combining character.

References

External links
ScriptSource—Positioning the traditional cedilla
 Diacritics Project—All you need to design a font with correct accents
 Keyboard Help—Learn how to make world language accent marks and other diacriticals on a computer

Latin-script diacritics
Turkish language